The Robert Luttrell who settled on the banks of the Liffey near Dublin at Luttrellstown, was in 1226 treasurer of St. Patrick's Cathedral and Archdeacon of Armagh, and in 1236 was Lord Chancellor of Ireland. There is mention of a Michael Luttrell in 1287, who owned the same estate at the close of the century, and later in 1349 of a Simon Luttrell, who died in the possession of the property. The next owner whose name we have is Robert Luttrell, who married a daughter of Sir Elias de Ashbourne, of Devon, England, and by this marriage added materially to his already large estate.

It is not certain whether the head of the Irish branch was a son or a brother of Sir Geoffrey, but it is reasonable that he bore either the one or the other relation, for the reason that the lands of Luttrellstown secured by royal grant by Sir Geoffrey were from this time (of Geoffrey's death) owned by Sir Robert Luttrell, head of the Irish branch, who lived at Lucan, near Dublin, and that it remained in the family until the early part of the nineteenth century.

See also
Other members of the Luttrell family
Luttrellstown Castle

References

External links
Lyte, Henry Churchill Maxwell, Sir,  A history of Dunster and of the families of Mohun & Luttrell, Part I, London, 1909.

People from Lucan, Dublin
Lord chancellors of Ireland
13th-century Irish people
Normans in Ireland
People from Lincolnshire